Alondras Club de Fútbol is a football team based in Cangas in the autonomous community of Galicia. Founded in 1928 and refounded in 1951, it plays in Tercera División RFEF – Group 1. Its stadium is Estadio Campo do Morrazo with a capacity of 2,800 seats.

History

Beginnings of football in Cangas
Football practice starts in Cangas around the year 1908, a period in which young people were looking anywhere organize their meetings. With a selection of these young people was created in 1914 that the Cangas FC disputa Limense in their parties, and we find a reference written in Faro de Vigo on 12 March 1920, due to play at Vigo in the field Coia of the Lamark, which lost by 5 to 1. Some names on this team are: Paredes, Julio, Ignacio, Columbus, XEX, Seijo, Luciano, Petouto, Gonzalo, Bermudez, Cervera, ... In 1922 he rents this equipment for the municipality land in the sands of Rodeiro for an amount of 200 pesetas a year.

Although this team was the most important, there were at the Villa as other teams: FC Lancia, Tuch FC, FC Union, Numancia, Sierra Morena, Morrazo, Baleata, Anduriña, Sisi FC, FC Yoyo, etc..

Over the years the field of Arenal Rodeiro inutilizando went and saw the need for a new one. The absence of field problems to find another confrontation between veterans and new players, led to the need to create a new club stronger, but something on which everyone agreed with a problem: the choice of name for the new club. Each name that suggested the veteran players, the newest responded with a different one. The solution was to face at a football match and the winners would put his name to the team, which lost pledging to respect it. The names were chosen and which were in dispute: "The punishment" and another "The Alondras." These names refer to two very popular works of a company varieties. Clearly won the supporters of "The Alondras" so this was the name of the new club began to face its history in the Moaña Leisure Maritime Meira 15 May 1928, the party won by 4 to 3.

Little by little loses the article "The" from its name and becomes the "Alondras CF" which initiates a stage victory, which makes the hobby again be with the team and again the need for a field where you can play.

At last on 6 December 1928 establishing the Alondras CF with the drafting of regulations and taking his first as a founding: Güido Paganini Picasso, Joe Smith Barros, Ramon Ocaña Larrin, Francisco Fernandez Cervera and Luciano Barreiro Fernandez. As curiosity can say that partner's children had to pay a monthly fee of 50 cents, partners and 5 number 1 peseta ESP partners protectors, as reflected in the regulations. In 1929 the club disputed different games considered "friendly", however striving to win, among them the victory 3–2 over the Ciosvin in Balaidos.

The club finished 2nd in the Group 1 of the Tercera División in the 2011-12 season.

Season to season

45 seasons in Tercera División
1 seasons in Tercera División RFEF

Stadium 
The Campo do Morrazo, owned by Alondras CF and recently reformed, is the stadium where the club plays its home games since 19 March 1971.

References

External links
 Alondras CF Official website 
 Futbolme.com profile 

Association football clubs established in 1951
Football clubs in Galicia (Spain)
1951 establishments in Spain